Kenneth Warren Dyal (July 9, 1910 – May 12, 1978) was an American politician who served one term as a U.S. Representative from California from 1965 to 1967.

Biography
Born in Bisbee, Arizona, Dyal attended the public schools of San Bernardino and Colton, California.
He moved to San Bernardino, California, in 1917.
Secretary to San Bernardino, County Board of Supervisors from 1941 to 1943.
He served as a lieutenant commander in the United States Naval Reserve from 1943 to 1946.
Postmaster of San Bernardino from 1947 to 1954.
Insurance company executive from 1954 to 1961.
He served as member of board of directors of Los Angeles Airways, Inc. from 1956 to 1964.

Congress
Dyal was elected as a Democrat to the Eighty-ninth Congress (January 3, 1965 – January 3, 1967).
He was an unsuccessful candidate for reelection in 1966 to the Ninetieth Congress.

Later career and death
After leaving Congress, he served as a regional director for the San Francisco, California, Post Office Department from 1966 to 1969.
He later became a Regional Programs Coordinator at the United States Post Office from 1969 to 1971.

In his later years, he resided in Oakland, California, until his death there May 12, 1978.
He was interred in Montecito Cemetery, Colton, California.

References

California postmasters
Democratic Party members of the United States House of Representatives from California
1910 births
1978 deaths
People from Bisbee, Arizona
Politicians from San Bernardino, California
United States Navy officers
20th-century American politicians
People from Oakland, California
Military personnel from California